Longvillers is a commune in the Calvados department in the Normandy region in northwestern France.

There are no shops, nor any commercial outlets in the hamlet, the nearest shops, food, bars or hotels are located either in Villers-Bocage or Aunay-sur-Odon.

Population

See also
Communes of the Calvados department

References

Communes of Calvados (department)
Calvados communes articles needing translation from French Wikipedia